This is a list of special education schools in Tokyo Metropolis, including the 23 special wards and West Tokyo. (No such schools are in the Islands of Tokyo).

Metropolitan schools

Blind

 Bunkyo - Bunkyo
 Hachioji - Hachioji
 Katsushika - Katsushika
 Kugayama Seiko Gakuen - Also for students differently abled in intellect - Setagaya

Deaf

 Chuo - Suginami
 Otsuka - Consists of a main campus (Toshima), Eifuku Branch (Suginami), Jonan Branch (Ota), and Joto Branch (Koto)
 Katsushika - Katsushika
 Tachikawa - Tachikawa

Differently abled in intellect
For students differently abled in intellectual matters:
 Adachi - Adachi
 Akiruno Gakuen - Also for students who also have physical disabilities - Akiruno
 Aoyama - Minato
 Chofu - Chofu
 Den-enchofu - Ota
 Eifuku Gakuen - Also for students who also have physical disabilities - Suginami
 Fuchu Keyakinomori Gakuen - Also for students with physical disabilities - Fuchu
 Hachioji - Hachioji
 Hachioji Nishi - Hachioji
 Hamura - Hamura
 Hanahata Gakuen - Also for students who also have physical disabilities - Adachi
 Higashikurume - Higashikurume
 Itabashi - Itabashi
 Joto - Koto
 Katsushika - Katsushika
 Kiyose - Kiyose
 Koganei - Koganei
 Koto - Koto
 Kugayama Seiko Gakuen - Also for students with vision impairment - Setagaya
 Machida-no-oka Gakuen - Two branches in Machida: The main branch is for students who are differently abled intellectually and differently abled physically, while the Yamazaki Branch is a general school for students differently abled in intellectual matters
 Minami-Hanahata - Adachi
 Minami-Osawa Gakuen - Hachioji
 Minato - Minato
 Mizumoto - Katsushika
 Mizumoto Koai Gakuen - Also for people differently abled in physical capabilities - Katsushika
 Musashidai Gakuen - Also for students with health issues - Fuchu
 Nakano - Nakano
 Nanao - Hino
 Nerima - Nerima
 Oji - Kita
 Rinkai Aomi - Koto
 Seicho - Setagaya
 Seiho Gakuen - Also for people differently abled in physical capabilities - Ome
 Shakujii - Nerima
 Shiinoki - Located in Ichihara, Chiba
 Shikamoto Gakuen - Also for people differently abled in physical capabilities - Edogawa
 Shimura Gakuen - Also for people differently abled in physical capabilities - Itabashi
 Shinagawa - Shinagawa
 Shirasagi - Edogawa
 Sumida - Sumida
 Takashima - Itabashi
 Tama Sakura-no-oka Gakuen - Also for people differently abled in physical capabilities - Tama
 Tachikawa Gakuen - Also for students with difficulties in hearing - Tachikawa
 Tanashi - Nishitokyo
 Yaguchi - Ota

Health difficulties
For students with health difficulties:
 Bokuto - Also for students with different physical abilities - Koto
 Kita - Also for students with different physical abilities - Kita
 Kodaira - Also for students with different physical abilities - Kodaira
 Komei Gakuen - Also for students with health issues - Setagaya
 Musashidai Gakuen Fuchu Branch - Also for students with disabilities of intellect - , Fuchu

Differently abled in physical states
For students differently abled in physical capabilities:
 Akiruno Gakuen - Also for people differently abled in intellectual capabilities - Akiruno
 Bokuto - Also for people with health issues - Koto
 Eifuku Gakuen - Also for people differently abled in intellectual capabilities - Suginami
 Fuchu Keyakinomori Gakuen - Also for people differently abled in intellectual capabilities - Fuchu
 Hachioji Higashi - Hachioji
 Hanahata Gakuen - Also for people differently abled in intellectual capabilities - Adachi
 Johoku - Adachi
 Jonan - Ota
 Kita - Also for people with health issues - Kita
 Kodaira - Also for people with health issues - Kodaira
 Komei Gakuen - Also for people with health issues - Setagaya
 Machida-no-oka Gakuen - Also for people differently abled in intellectual capabilities - Machida
 Mizumoto Koai Gakuen - Also for people differently abled in intellectual capabilities - Katsushika
 Murayama - Musashimurayama
 Oizumi - Nerima
 Seiho Gakuen - Also for people differently abled in intellectual capabilities - Ome
 Shikamoto Gakuen - Also for people differently abled in intellectual capabilities - Edogawa
 Shimura Gakuen - Also for people differently abled in intellectual capabilities - Itabashi
 Tama Sakura-no-oka Gakuen - Also for people differently abled in intellectual capabilities - Tama

Municipal schools
 Shinjuku City
 Shinjuku School for the Handicapped (新宿区立新宿養護学校) 

Note that Hota Shiosai Elementary School (保田しおさい学校) is physically located in Kyonan, Awa District, Chiba Prefecture, but it is a municipally-operated school by Katsushika City.

Private schools
  - It uses Japanese sign language.

References

Special
Special schools in Japan